Fiqifuliye is a town in the Erigavo District of Sanaag region of Somaliland.

Recent History
On June 1, 1993, a meeting between the Habar Yoonis and the Dhulbahante clans was held in Fiqifuliye, and the Habar Yoonis clan agreed to invite the Dhulbahante clan to the upcoming clan meeting in Erigavo.

In July 2013, in Fiqifuliye, more than 600 militiamen who had previously been on the Khatumo State side announced that they would join the Somaliland army.

In March 2016, the Puntland Drought Relief Committee (based in Bosaso) dispatched a water truck as a first aid response to the drought around Fiqifuliye.

In December 2018, Somaliland's Sanaag Governor Maxamed Axmed Caalin (Tiimbaro) visited Fiqifuliye and promised to initiate government projects.

In October 2020, a hospital was fundeded in Fiqifuliye with donations from the diaspora. The Somaliland Ministry of Health is considering providing funding.

Demographics
The city of Fiqifuliye is primarily inhabited by the Mohamoud Garad branch of the Dhulbahante clan. The Naleye Ahmed sub-sub lineages, particulary the Bihina Caraale (Bah ina Araale) are well represented there.

See also
Administrative divisions of Somaliland
Regions of Somaliland
Districts of Somaliland
Somalia–Somaliland border

References

Fiqi Fuliye, Somalia

Populated places in Sanaag